Severe Tropical Cyclone Keli (NPMOC/JTWC Designation: 38P) was the first recorded post-season tropical cyclone to form in June within the South Pacific Ocean. The system formed on June 7, 1997, about 460 kilometers (285 mi) to the north of Tokelau. The depression gradually developed over the next few days while moving southwestward. It was designated as Tropical Cyclone Keli early the next day. Cyclone Keli intensified, slowly reaching its 10-minute peak wind speeds of 150 km/h, (90 mph), which made it a Category 3 severe tropical cyclone on the Australian Tropical Cyclone Intensity Scale. As it came under the influence of strong mid latitude westerlies and moved into an area of strong vertical wind shear, the cyclone started to weaken and was declared as extratropical on June 15.

Cyclone Keli struck the islands of Tuvalu on June 12 and 13, with extensive damage reported throughout the Islands with trees uprooted by wind and waves. On Nivalakita, all buildings except for the church were flattened; an estimated cost to rebuild all of the houses as they were before the cyclone hit was estimated at A$ (US$), while it was estimated that the cost of rebuilding the houses with an improved, cyclone-resistant design would be about A$ (US$). The whole of Tepuka Savilivili was left uninhabitable, as coconut trees and other vegetation were swept away with no more than an area of jagged coral left behind. In Fiji, strong winds and rough seas were reported from the cyclone as it was moving to the north of Fiji, and while the cyclone was weakening it dropped 3.76 inches (95.5mm) of rain on American Samoa.

Meteorological history

Severe Tropical Cyclone Keli was first noted as a depression, to the northeast of the New Zealand territory of Tokelau during June 7, 1997. Over the next couple of days the system moved towards the south-west and gradually developed further, with the United States Naval Pacific Meteorology and Oceanography Center (NPMOC) issuing a tropical cyclone formation alert for the system during June 9.

The system was subsequently named Keli by the Fiji Meteorological Service, after it had developed into a Category 1 tropical cyclone on the Australian tropical cyclone intensity scale. During that day the system continued to move south-westwards, towards the island nation of Tuvalu and passed near or over the island of Niulakita during June 11. After it the system had passed over Niulakita, Keli rapidly intensified in an area of light vertical wind shear, as it moved slowly and performed a small cyclonic loop.

Early on June 12, the FMS reported that Keli had peaked as a Category 3 severe tropical cyclone, with 10-minute sustained windspeeds of 150 km/h (90 mph). During that day the system started to weaken and came to within  of making a second landfall on Niulakita, before it accelerated south-eastwards as it interacted with the Westerlies. The NPMOC also reported during that day that Keli had peaked with 1-minute sustained wind speeds of 215 km/h (130 mph), which made it equivalent to a Category 4 hurricane on the Saffir-Simpson hurricane wind scale. Later that day Keli started to transition into an extratropical cyclone, during the following day the system passed within  of Apia, Samoa. During June 15, the FMS reported that Keli had weakened into a tropical depression, while the NPMOC reported that it had degenerated into an extratropical cyclone.

Impact and aftermath

Heavy rain was reported in American Samoa with a rainfall total, of  reported at Afono in American Samoa.
The name Keli was retired after this usage of the name and was replaced with the name Kofi.

Tuvalu

Keli was the third and final tropical cyclone to impact Tuvalu during the 1996–97 season, after Severe Tropical Cyclone's Gavin and Hina affected the island nation during March 1997. Ahead of the system impacting Tuvalu, storm and gale-force wind warnings were issued for the islands of Niulakita and Nukulaelae, while a strong wind warning was issued for the rest of the group during June 10. During that day the system moved south-westwards and passed near or over Niulakita later that day, before it performed a cyclonic loop and passed within  of Niulakita during June 12.

As Cyclone Keli struck the islands of Tuvalu on June 12 and 13, peak wind gusts of 165 km/h, (105 mph) were reported, with extensive damage also reported throughout the Islands with trees uprooted by wind and waves. On Nivalakita all buildings except for the church were flattened with an estimated cost to rebuild the houses exactly as they were was estimated at A$12,000 (US$10,000 1997), while it was estimated that the cost of rebuilding the houses with an improved, cyclone-resistant design would be about A$84,000 (US$63,000 1997). Also on Nivalakita communications were cut with the telephone operator having to resort to sending a Morse code message, however as the storm re-curved and re-hit Tuvalu on June 14, it silenced the weak radio telegraph system. In Tepuka Savilivili the whole island was left uninhabitable as coconut trees and other vegetation were swept away with no more than an area of jagged coral left behind.

With effect from June 12, a state of public emergency was declared for the whole of Tuvalu, by the then Governor-General of Tuvalu, Sir Tulaga Manuella. This was because there was only a limited amount of food available on Funafuti to cater for the whole of the island nation, while providing Niulakita with immediate relief supplies. This enabled the Tuvaluan embassy in Suva, Fiji to appeal to various overseas countries and organisations including Australia, New Zealand, the United Kingdom and the United Nations Development Programme to provide aid and assistance to the island nation. During June 14, the Royal New Zealand Air Force deployed a transport plane carrying some relief materials including tarpaulins and water from New Zealand. The plane subsequently stopped in Noumea, New Caledonia and Nadi, Fiji to pick up further relief supplies that had been donated by Australia, Fiji and France. The crew of the plane subsequently conducted an aerial assessment of the damage on Niulakita, and reported seeing widespread damage, before they arrived at Funafuti Airport during June 15.

Wallis and Futuna
Cyclone Keli was the third out of four tropical cyclones to impact the French Territory of Wallis and Futuna during a ten-month period, after Cyclones Gavin and Hina had affected the island during March 1997.

Tonga
Keli was the second of three tropical cyclones to affect Tonga during a ten-month period, with Cyclones Hina and Ron affecting the island nation during March 1997 and January 1998. Ahead of the system impacting Tonga, the FMS issued cyclone warnings for the Niuas and strong wind warnings for the rest of Tonga. As a result of the warnings a vessel that was heading to the island group had to be recalled, which was predicted to affect supplies on the islands when it was likely to be most needed. During June 13, Keli caused some damage to the islands with plantations, breadfruit trees and other large trees devastated. The strong winds also destroyed several residences while causing damage to public buildings.

See also

1996–97 South Pacific cyclone season
List of off-season South Pacific tropical cyclones

References

External links

1996–97 South Pacific cyclone season
Category 3 South Pacific cyclones
Keli
Retired South Pacific cyclones
Tropical cyclones in American Samoa
Tropical cyclones in Fiji
Tropical cyclones in Samoa
Tropical cyclones in Tokelau
Tropical cyclones in Tuvalu